Karl Johannes Virma (17 March 1879 Tallinn – 19 November 1942 Kirov Oblast) was an Estonian politician. He was a member of the I, II and III Riigikogu. 1924-1925 he was Road Minister.

On 14 June 1941, Virma was arrested in Tallinn by the NKVD following the Soviet occupation of Estonia. He was placed within the Soviet Gulag camp system and died on 19 November 1941.

References

1879 births
1942 deaths
Politicians from Tallinn
People from Kreis Harrien
Estonian Social Democratic Workers' Party politicians
Estonian Socialist Workers' Party politicians
Government ministers of Estonia
Members of the Estonian Provincial Assembly
Members of the Estonian Constituent Assembly
Members of the Riigikogu, 1920–1923
Members of the Riigikogu, 1923–1926
Members of the Riigikogu, 1926–1929
Estonian people who died in Soviet detention
People who died in the Gulag